Salvatore Formica (born 1 March 1927), best known as Rino Formica, is a former Italian politician.

Biography
Formica was born in Bari.

He became a member of national importance of the Italian Socialist Party (Italian: Partito Socialista Italiano, or simply PSI) during the leadership of Bettino Craxi. He was several times Minister of the Italian Republic starting from 1980. He was Minister of Budget in the Spadolini II Cabinet, whose fall was caused by a quarrel between Formica and the other economy minister Beniamino Andreatta.

Formica was strongly critical of the PSI's transformation from a popular, social-based party into one involved in numerous corruption and official malfeasance scandals under Craxi. He declared "the convent is poor, but the monks are rich" (in reference to PSI's financial problems, where its members were instead increasingly well endowed), and defined PSI's national assembly as "a court of dwarves and ballerinas. Formica was one of the numerous PSI members involved in the Mani Pulite scandal of the early 1990s, although he was acquitted in the two trials raised against him. After Craxi's resignation as PSI national secretary in 1993, he supported Claudio Martelli as his successor. In 1994 he was not re-elected to the Italian Parliament for the first time since the 1970s.

In 2003 he founded a post-Socialist party called Socialismo è Libertà and later adhered to the new Italian Socialist Party, a small-sized formation of socialists who did not join the Democratic Party.

References

External links

1927 births
Living people
People from Bari
Italian Socialist Party politicians
Finance ministers of Italy
Government ministers of Italy
Transport ministers of Italy